Grabbe is a Don Cossacks noble family of a Finnish nobility origin, included in Russian. Counts of Russian Empire since 1856.

Notable members 
 Paul Hrisztoforovicz Graf Grabbe (1789—1875) was a Russian Full General of Cavalry in time of Napoleonic Wars. 
 Alexander N. Graf Grabbe-Nikitin (1864—1947) was a Russian General of last Russian Tsar Nikolai II Konvoi.

External links
  Shumkov, A.A., Ryklis, I.G. List of noble families of the Don Cossacks in alphabetical order. VIRD Publ House, Sankt-Peterburg. 2000, 

Don Cossacks noble families
Russian noble families
Families of Finnish ancestry